Medinah is a station on Metra's Milwaukee District West Line in Medinah, Illinois. In Metra's zone-based fare system, Medinah is in zone E. As of 2018, Medinah is the 110th busiest of Metra's 236 non-downtown stations, with an average of 439 weekday boardings.

As of December 12, 2022, Medinah is served by 43 trains (21 inbound, 22 outbound) on weekdays, by all 24 trains (12 in each direction) on Saturdays, and by all 18 trains (nine in each direction) on Sundays and holidays.

References

External links 

Station from Medinah Road from Google Maps Street View

Metra stations in Illinois
Former Chicago, Milwaukee, St. Paul and Pacific Railroad stations
Medinah, Illinois
Railway stations in DuPage County, Illinois
Railway stations in the United States opened in 1959